Members of the Victorian Legislative Council, the upper house of the Parliament of the Australian State of Victoria, are elected from eight multi-member electorates called regions. The Legislative Council has 40 members, five from each of the eight regions.

The boundaries of the electoral regions were last drawn in 2021.

Reform of 2003
A major reform of the Parliament was made by the Labor government, led by Steve Bracks, by the Constitution (Parliamentary Reform) Act 2003. Under the new system, members of the Legislative Council serve terms linked to elections for the Legislative Assembly, which are fixed four-year terms, unless dissolved sooner.

Each electoral region consists of 11 contiguous Legislative Assembly electoral districts with about 420,000 electors each. Each region elects five members to the Legislative Council by a single transferable vote. There are currently 40 members of the Legislative Council, four fewer than previously. The changes also introduced proportional representation, making it easier for minor parties to gain seats in the Legislative Council. With each region electing 5 members, the quota for a seat in each region, after distribution of preferences, is 16.7% (one-sixth). At the same time, the Council's ability to block supply was removed.

The Electoral Boundaries Commission drew the boundaries of the new regions in 2005. The new system came into effect for the 2006 Victorian election.

Current regions 
Victoria is divided into eight electoral regions, 3 rural and 5 metropolitan:

 Eastern Victoria Region
 North-Eastern Metropolitan Region
 Northern Metropolitan Region
 Northern Victoria Region
 South-Eastern Metropolitan Region
 Southern Metropolitan Region
 Western Metropolitan Region
 Western Victoria Region

The boundaries of the electoral regions were last drawn in 2021 in unison with the redistricting of electorates. Prior to the 2022 state election, the Eastern Metropolitan Region was renamed the North-Eastern Metropolitan region.

Provinces 1856 to 2006 
The Legislative Council was formerly elected from 22 single-member electorates called "provinces". The members of the council sat for two assembly terms so two members sat for each province. This is a list of the provinces as of 2005:

 Ballarat Province (1937)
 Central Highlands Province (1976)
 Chelsea Province (1976)
 Doutta Galla Province (1937)
 East Yarra Province (1904)
 Eumemmerring Province (1985)
 Geelong Province (1976)
 Gippsland Province (1882)
 Higinbotham Province (1937)
 Jika Jika Province (1985)
 Koonung Province (1992)
 Melbourne Province (1882)
 Melbourne North Province (1904)
 Melbourne West Province (1904)
 Monash Province (1937)
 North Eastern Province (1882)
 North Western Province# (1856)
 Silvan Province (1992)
 South Eastern Province (1882)
 Templestowe Province (1967)
 Waverley Province (1976)
 Western Province# (1856)
 Western Port Province (2002)

The following provinces also existed but were abolished prior to 2002:

 Bendigo Province (1904–1985)
 Boronia Province (1967–1992)
 Central Province# (1856–1882)
 Eastern Province# (1856–1882)
 Melbourne East Province (1904–1937)
 Melbourne South Province (1904–1937)
 Nelson Province (1882–1937)
 North Central Province (1882–1904)
 North Yarra Province (1882–1904)
 Northern Province (1882–1976)
 Nunawading Province (1976–1992)
 Public and Railway Officers Province (1904–1907)
 South Western Province#  (1856–1976)
 South Yarra Province (1882–1904)
 Southern Province# (1856–1967)
 Thomastown Province (1976–1985)
 Wellington Province  (1882–1937)

# = Original Province of inaugural (upper-house chamber) Legislative Council 1856

The old system tended to favour the Liberal Party and the National Party (often in coalition) over the Labor Party and other parties . This caused many instances where a Labor-controlled Assembly faced an opposition-controlled Council — a rare occurrence elsewhere in Australia.

Electoral districts 1851 to 1856
The Victorian Legislative Council was initially a single chamber (unicameral) when first created and consisted of members some of whom were nominated and some elected. The electoral districts were:

 Avoca
 Ballaarat
 Belfast and Warrnambool
 Castlemaine
 Geelong
 Gipps' Land
 Grant
 Kilmore, Kyneton and Seymour
 Loddon
 City of Melbourne
 Murray
 Normanby, Dundas and Follett
 North Bourke
 Ovens
 Portland
 Ripon, Hampden, Grenville and Polwarth
 Sandhurst
 South Bourke, Evelyn and Mornington
 Talbot, Dalhousie and Angelsey
 Villiers and Heytesbury
 Wimmera

References 

 
Victoria